is a Japanese instructor of Shotokan karate.  He has  won the JKA All-Japan championships for kumite. He is currently an instructor of the Japan Karate Association.

Biography
Keisuke Nemoto was born in Chiba Prefecture, Japan on 31 May 1979. He studied at Chiba Industrial University. His karate training began at age 5.

Competition
Keisuke Nemoto has won the JKA All Japan Karate Championship multiple times and reached 3rd place at the Funakoshi Gichin Cup World Karate-do Championship Tournament twice.

Major tournaments 
12th Funakoshi Gichin Cup World Karate-do Championship Tournament (Pattaya, 2011) – 3rd Place Kumite
10th Funakoshi Gichin Cup World Karate-do Championship Tournament (Sydney, 2006) – 3rd Place Kumite
53rd JKA All Japan Karate Championship (2010) – 1st Place Kumite
55th JKA All Japan Karate Championship (2012) – 1st Place Kumite
56th JKA All Japan Karate Championship (2013) – 1st Place Kumite

References

 

1979 births
Japanese male karateka
Karate coaches
Shotokan practitioners
Sportspeople from Chiba Prefecture
Living people
Chiba Institute of Technology alumni